2MASS J21392676+0220226 (or CFBDS J213926+02202) is a brown dwarf located  from Earth in the constellation Aquarius. Its surface is thought to be host to a massive storm, resulting in large variability of its color. It is a member of the Carina-Near moving group. This brown dwarf was discovered in the Two Micron All-Sky Survey (2MASS).

Once thought to be a binary object based on a 2010 study, it has since been shown to in fact be single.

References

Brown dwarfs
T-type stars
L-type stars
J21392676+0220226
Aquarius (constellation)